The 2001 Singer Sri Lankan Airlines Rugby 7s was the third year of the Singer Sri Lankan Airlines Rugby 7s tournament. All matches were played at Bogambara Stadium in Kandy, Sri Lanka on 15 and 16 September 2001. 2001 was the second year that the competition was expanded to include non-Asian rugby playing nations, with teams from the Belgium, Czech Republic, Denmark and Germany competing. Chinese Taipei defeated South Korea in the final to take the Cup for the second time, becoming the first team to win the cup twice. The Czech Republic and Denmark won the Bowl and Plate finals respectively.

Group stage

Pool A

 21 - 00 
 26 - 19 
 14 - 12 
 35 - 14 
 28 - 05 
 24 - 07 

{| class="wikitable" style="text-align: center;"
|-
!width="200"|Teams
!width="40"|Pld
!width="40"|W
!width="40"|D
!width="40"|L
!width="40"|PF
!width="40"|PA
!width="40"|+/−
!width="40"|Pts
|-style="background:#ccffcc"
|align=left| 
|3||2||0||1||78||47||+31||7
|-style="background:#ccffcc"
|align=left| 
|3||2||0||1||66||33||+28||7
|-style="background:#ffe6bd"
|align=left| 
|3||2||0||1||42||36||+6||7
|-style="background:#fcc6bd"
|align=left| 
|3||0||0||3||19||84||−65||0
|}

Pool B

 05 - 00  Arabian Gulf
 20 - 10 
 14 - 00 
 Arabian Gulf 24 - 19 
 14 - 00  Arabian Gulf
 14 - 12 

{| class="wikitable" style="text-align: center;"
|-
!width="200"|Teams
!width="40"|Pld
!width="40"|W
!width="40"|D
!width="40"|L
!width="40"|PF
!width="40"|PA
!width="40"|+/−
!width="40"|Pts
|-style="background:#ccffcc"
|align=left| 
|3||2||0||1||31||14||+17||7
|-style="background:#ccffcc"
|align=left| 
|3||2||0||1||34||24||+10||7
|-style="background:#ffe6bd"
|align=left| 
|3||1||0||2||43||58||−15||5
|-style="background:#fcc6bd"
|align=left|  Arabian Gulf
|3||1||0||2||24||43||-19||5
|}

Pool C

 38 - 07 
 26 - 05 
 54 - 00 
 19 - 12 
 19 - 05 
 50 - 00 

{| class="wikitable" style="text-align: center;"
|-
!width="200"|Teams
!width="40"|Pld
!width="40"|W
!width="40"|D
!width="40"|L
!width="40"|PF
!width="40"|PA
!width="40"|+/−
!width="40"|Pts
|-style="background:#ccffcc"
|align=left| 
|3||3||0||0||99||10||+89||9
|-style="background:#ccffcc"
|align=left| 
|3||2||0||1||74||38||+36||7
|-style="background:#ffe6bd"
|align=left| 
|3||1||0||2||55||45||+10||5
|-style="background:#fcc6bd"
|align=left| 
|3||0||0||3||7||142||−135||3
|}

Pool D

 26 - 00  Barbarians
  31 - 12 
 12 - 00 
 47 - 00  Barbarians
 14 - 12  Barbarians
 24 - 19 

{| class="wikitable" style="text-align: center;"
|-
!width="200"|Teams
!width="40"|Pld
!width="40"|W
!width="40"|D
!width="40"|L
!width="40"|PF
!width="40"|PA
!width="40"|+/−
!width="40"|Pts
|-style="background:#ccffcc"
|align=left| 
|3||2||0||1||78||24||+54||7
|-style="background:#ccffcc"
|align=left| 
|3||2||0||1||62||50||+12||7
|-style="background:#ffe6bd"
|align=left| 
|3||2||0||1||45||36||+9||7
|-style="background:#fcc6bd"
|align=left|  Barbarians
|3||0||0||3||12||87||−75||3
|}

Second round

Bowl

Plate

Cup

References

2001
2001 rugby sevens competitions
2001 in Asian rugby union
rugby sevens